FCE USA is the foreign branch of Mexican publishing house Fondo de Cultura Económica in the United States.

Established on September 7, 1990, the branch of Fondo de Cultura Económica in San Diego, California, is ever expanding with the mission of promoting and broadcasting the works of Mexican and Latin American authors among the population of Hispanic origin in the United States.

In order to augment its presence in the USA, FCE USA signed an agreement with Lectorum-Scholastic for the distribution and commercialization of books among the latter's library and school networks.

See also 
Fondo de Cultura Económica
Foreign Branches of Fondo de Cultura Económica

External links 
www.fceusa.com

Companies based in San Diego
Book publishing companies based in California
Publishing companies established in 1990